Sugaring is a food preservation technique.

Sugaring may also refer to:

 Sugaring (epilation), a method of hair removal
 The process of collection and production of maple syrup
 A slang term for sugar dating